Eric Keller is a collegiate wrestling coach, currently at Wartburg College in Waverly, Iowa. Keller was promoted to co-head coach in 2010 with then head coach Jim Miller, and became the sole head coach after Miller stepped down following the 2012–2013 season.

Wrestling career 
Keller went to high school in Indianola, Iowa at Indianola high school where he was a four-year member of the wrestling team.  He would go on to finish his high school career 161-10-1 and was a 2 time Iowa high school state champion, finishing first in the 103 and 119 pound weight class. After high school he went on to the University of Northern Iowa where he was a member of the wrestling team from 1995 to 1999.  During his senior year in 1998-1999 he served as team captain and capped of the year with all-American honors at the NCAA Division I Wrestling Championships when he place 6th in the 133lb weight class.

Collegiate coaching career 
Keller began his coaching career at Wartburg College in 1999 following graduation at UNI.  He would stay at Wartburg until he took the head coaching position at North Central College in Naperville, Illinois in 2005.  In his one season at North Central he completed an undefeated season at 7-0 and was named National Wrestling Coaches Association's Rookie Coach of the Year at the 2006 national tournament. Following the 2005–2006 season Keller returned to wartburg and was named associate head coach, a position he would keep until being elevated to co-head coach for the 2010–2011 season. During his time as co-head coach Wartburg would go on to win 3 straight NCAA national titles.  Prior to the 2012–2013 season Jim Miller would announce his retirement following the season, making Keller the sole head coach of Wartburg College for the 2013–2014 season. Wartburg would again go on to make history that season by winning their 4th straight NCAA title. Keller has won 8 NCAA Division III Wrestling Championships as head coach, the most recent coming in 2022 in what would be his slimest margin of victory.

Coaching results

! colspan=6| Coaching Record
|-
! Season
! Team Finish
! Dual Record
! All Americans
! National Champions
|-
! style=background:white colspan=5|North Central College
|-
|  style="background:white; font-size:88%;"|2006
|style="font-size:88%"|14th
|style="font-size:88%"|7-0-0
|style="font-size:88%"|3
|style="font-size:88%"|0
|-
! style=background:white colspan=5|Wartburg College
|-
|  style="background:white; font-size:88%;"|2011
|style="font-size:88%"|
|style="font-size:88%"|19-1
|style="font-size:88%"|7
|style="font-size:88%"|2
|-
|  style="background:white; font-size:88%;"|2012
|style="font-size:88%"|
|style="font-size:88%"|19-1
|style="font-size:88%"|8
|style="font-size:88%"|4
|-
|  style="background:white; font-size:88%;"|2013
|style="font-size:88%"|
|style="font-size:88%"|19-0
|style="font-size:88%"|7
|style="font-size:88%"|2
|-
|  style="background:white; font-size:88%;"|2014
|style="font-size:88%"|
|style="font-size:88%"|18-0
|style="font-size:88%"|6
|style="font-size:88%"|3
|-
|  style="background:white; font-size:88%;"|2015
|style="font-size:88%"|
|style="font-size:88%"|18-1
|style="font-size:88%"|8
|style="font-size:88%"|1
|-
|  style="background:white; font-size:88%;"|2016
|style="font-size:88%"|
|style="font-size:88%"|19-0
|style="font-size:88%"|8
|style="font-size:88%"|1
|-
|  style="background:white; font-size:88%;"|2017
|style="font-size:88%"|
|style="font-size:88%"|20-0
|style="font-size:88%"|9
|style="font-size:88%"|1
|-
|  style="background:white; font-size:88%;"|2018
|style="font-size:88%"|
|style="font-size:88%"|18-2
|style="font-size:88%"|8
|style="font-size:88%"|3
|-
|  style="background:white; font-size:88%;"|2019
|style="font-size:88%"|6th
|style="font-size:88%"|16-1
|style="font-size:88%"|4
|style="font-size:88%"|0
|-
|  style="background:white; font-size:88%;"|2020
|style="font-size:88%"|DNC
|style="font-size:88%"|16-1
|style="font-size:88%"|5
|style="font-size:88%"|0
|-
|  style="background:white; font-size:88%;"|2021
|style="font-size:88%"|NWCA
|style="font-size:88%"|9-1
|style="font-size:88%"|8
|style="font-size:88%"|2
|-
|  style="background:white; font-size:88%;"|2022
|style="font-size:88%"|
|style="font-size:88%"|13-1
|style="font-size:88%"|7
|style="font-size:88%"|0
|-
|  style="background:white; font-size:88%;"|2023
|style="font-size:88%"|
|style="font-size:88%"|14-1
|style="font-size:88%"|5
|style="font-size:88%"|2
|-
| colspan="2"  style="background:LIGHTgrey; font-size:88%;"|Career
|  style="background:LIGHTgrey; font-size:88%;"|225-10
|  style="background:LIGHTgrey; font-size:88%;"|93
|  style="background:LIGHTgrey; font-size:88%;"|21

References

External links
 Eric Keller Coaching Profile

Living people
Northern Iowa Panthers wrestling
People from Indianola, Iowa
American male sport wrestlers
Year of birth missing (living people)